Unforgettable is the fifty-seventh studio album by American country singer and songwriter Merle Haggard, released in 2004.

Background
Unforgettable marked Haggard's return to Capitol Records, where he had enjoyed his biggest success for most of the 1960s and 1970s. This collection sees Haggard trying his hand at pre-rock and roll pop standards such as "Stardust" and "As Time Goes By." In addition to these classics, Haggard offers "What Can Love Do", which he composed with his wife Teresa, and covers the Freddy Powers song "Still Missing You". It peaked at number 39 on the Billboard country albums chart.

Critical reception

Stephen Thomas Erlewine of AllMusic deems the album as "warm, relaxed and laid-back, impeccably performed, and pleasurable to hear. Not that it contains any surprises—it's filled with low-key, piano-driven arrangements suited for a late-night smoky bar or any other of the many similarly styled standards records—but what makes Unforgettable work is Haggard's easy, assured delivery. He may not reinvent these songs, but he sings them as if they were his own, making this a small, romantic gem for listeners who love Hag the singer as much as they love Hag the writer."

Track listing
"As Time Goes By" (Herman Hupfeld) – 3:09
"Gypsy" (Billy Reid) – 3:31
"Unforgettable" (Irving Gordon) – 3:04
"Stardust" (Hoagy Carmichael, Mitchell Parish) – 4:01
"I Can't Get Started" (Vernon Duke, Ira Gershwin) – 3:18
"Still Missing You" (Freddy Powers) – 2:46
"Pennies from Heaven" (Johnny Burke, Arthur Johnston) – 3:21
"Cry Me a River" (Arthur Hamilton) – 3:59
"I'll Get By (As Long as I Have You)" (Fred E. Ahlert, Roy Turk) – 3:06
"You're Nobody till Somebody Loves You" (Russ Morgan, Larry Stock, James Cavanaugh) – 2:37
"What Love Can Do" (Merle Haggard, Teresa Lane Haggard) – 3:31
"Goin' Away Party" (Cindy Walker) – 4:26

Personnel
Merle Haggard – vocals, guitar
Biff Adam – drums
Don Markham – saxophone, trumpet
Gary Church – trombone
Clint Strong – guitar
Johnny Gimble – fiddle
Freddy Powers – drums, guitar
Eddie Curtis – bass
B.B. Morse – bass
Leland Sklar – bass
Terry Domingue – drums
Floyd Domino – piano
Larrie Londin – drums
Abe Manuel – accordion, fiddle, guitar
Joe Manuel – guitar
Randy Mason – drums, guitar
Joe Reed – bass
Oleg Schramm – piano
Catherine Styron – piano
Redd Volkaert – guitar
Mike Wheeler – guitar
Bobby Wood – piano
Bruce McBeth – violin
Rose Katai – violin
Soo Kyong Kim – viola
Kevin Price – cello

References

2004 albums
Merle Haggard albums
Capitol Records albums
Traditional pop albums